Montagne Cocotte is  a 771 metre tall mountain peak in Mauritius. It is located in the far south of the island nation, in the Savanne District and in the Black River Gorges National Park.  On the mountain slopes can be seen high altitude rainforest.

References

Cocotte